José Marcelo Álvarez (born 24 December 1975) is a Paraguayan fencer. He competed in the individual foil and épée events at the 1992 Summer Olympics.

References

External links
 

1975 births
Living people
Paraguayan male épée fencers
Olympic fencers of Paraguay
Fencers at the 1992 Summer Olympics
Paraguayan male foil fencers
20th-century Paraguayan people